Together Again for the Last Time is an album by saxophonists Sonny Stitt and Gene Ammons recorded in 1973 and released on the Prestige label in 1976. The album was the final recording by the pair, who had a long history of collaboration, prior to the death of Ammons in 1974.

Reception
The Allmusic review stated "Their similar styles and combative approach made their musical encounters quite exciting and this Prestige LP, their last joint recording, has some strong trade-offs... this is a fine date that is recommended to fans of the two tenors".

Track listing 
All compositions by Gene Ammons except as indicated
 "Saxification" - 4:38
 "The More I See You" (Mack Gordon, Harry Warren) - 10:22 
 "The Window Pain" - 4:47 
 "I'll Close My Eyes" (Buddy Kaye, Billy Reid) - 5:06
 "One for Amos" - 4:57  
 "For All We Know" (J. Fred Coots, Sam M. Lewis) - 5:52
Recorded at C.I. Studios, New York on November 20, 1973 (track 4), November 21, 1973 (tracks 5 & 6) and December 10, 1973 (tracks 1-3)

Personnel 
Gene Ammons - tenor saxophone (tracks 1-5)
Sonny Stitt - tenor saxophone (tracks 1, 3, 5 & 6) 
Junior Mance - piano, electric piano
Sam Jones - bass
Ajaramu J. Shelton (tracks 1-3), Mickey Roker (tracks 4-6) - drums
Warren Smith - percussion (tracks 1-3)

References 

1976 albums
Prestige Records albums
Collaborative albums
Gene Ammons albums
Sonny Stitt albums
Albums produced by Duke Pearson